Camp Run is a tributary of Connoquenessing Creek in western Pennsylvania.  The stream rises in southeastern Lawrence County and flows south entering Connoquenessing Creek at Fombell, Pennsylvania. The watershed is roughly 39% agricultural, 55% forested and the rest is other uses.

History
Camp Run is named for the "sugar camps" that historically lined the valley.

References

Rivers of Pennsylvania
Tributaries of the Beaver River
Rivers of Beaver County, Pennsylvania
Rivers of Butler County, Pennsylvania
Rivers of Lawrence County, Pennsylvania